Theodemer (also Theudomer) was a Frankish king. He was the son of Richomeres and his wife Ascyla. His father is possibly to be identified with the Roman commander of that name, in which case Theodemer would have been a cousin of Arbogastes. 

Not much is known of Theodemer. According to Gregory of Tours a war broke out between the Franks and the Romans some unknown time after the fall of the usurping Emperor Jovinus (411–413) who had been supported by the Franks. Around 422, a Roman army entered Gaul. King Theodemer and his mother Ascyla were executed by the sword. Theodemer's reign is supposed to be before that of king Chlodio, and the Chronicle of Fredegar makes Chlodio his son.

References

Further reading 
Gregory of Tours, Historia Francorum, book II, chapter 9.
Prosopography of the Later Roman Empire (PLRE II), J.R. Martindale

Frankish kings
Frankish warriors
5th-century Frankish people
5th-century monarchs in Europe
Year of birth unknown
Year of death unknown